St. James Hotel in Red Wing, Minnesota is an Italianate building built in 1874-1875.  It was listed on the National Register of Historic Places in 1977.  The NRHP-listed area was increased to become St. James Hotel and Buildings in 1982. St. James Hotel is a member of Historic Hotels of America, the official program of the National Trust for Historic Preservation.

As a result of the city's wealth, and with a need to house businesspeople and tourists visiting the city, eleven prominent businessmen invested in the construction of the hotel. It opened with a grand ball on Thanksgiving Day, 1875. It was one of the most elaborate hotels along the Mississippi River and served the city during its heyday as a commercial center and a steamboat stop.

The hotel was purchased in 1977 by the Red Wing Shoe Company and renovated.  It was also given two additions, a shopping courtyard and a new section for offices and hotel rooms.  Until recently, the hotel had 61 guest rooms, each with its own unique decoration and bearing the name of a riverboat that used to travel up and down the Mississippi River.  In early 2010, a new suite housed in the old Red Wing Iron Works Building was added to the hotel, bringing the number of rooms to 62.

See also
 List of Historic Hotels of America

References

External links

St. James Hotel (official site)

Buildings and structures in Goodhue County, Minnesota
Hotel buildings completed in 1875
Hotel buildings on the National Register of Historic Places in Minnesota
Italianate architecture in Minnesota
Red Wing, Minnesota
National Register of Historic Places in Goodhue County, Minnesota
Historic Hotels of America